Joseph Steven Crispin (born July 18, 1979) is an American college men's basketball head coach for Rowan University. Crispin was named head coach of the Profs on May 9, 2016, replacing Joe Cassidy, who remains on staff as an assistant.

Crispin was one of the most prolific scorers and efficient point guards in NJSIAA History. He averaged 35.6 Pts/G his Senior and Junior campaigns and overall 24.9Pts/G over his four years. In 117 Career games including the playoffs, he only had one game that he failed to hit double digits in scoring.

As a collegiate player, Crispin played college basketball at Pennsylvania State University alongside his brother, Jon.  Crispin was part of the 2001 Penn State team that upset the national powerhouse North Carolina Tar Heels in the NCAA Division I men's basketball tournament to advance to the Sweet Sixteen.

Crispin only played in the NBA during the 2001-02 NBA season and split time with the Los Angeles Lakers and Phoenix Suns. He also signed with the Miami Heat in 2003 but was waived before the 2003–04 season began. He played a total of 21 games and had averages of 3.8 points and 1.2 assists. His final NBA game was played on April 17th, 2002 in a 89 - 76 win over the Dallas Mavericks where he only played for 24 seconds, substituting at the very end of the game for Dan Majerle. He recorded no stats in that 24 seconds.

Crispin has also played in the ABA, CBA, USBL, with Anwil Włocławek of the Polish Basketball League, with Teramo in Italy, and with Banvit of the Turkish Basketball League. He signed with Barcellona Pozzo di Gotto in Italy for the 2010–11 season. The next season, he joined Azovmash Mariupol in Ukraine.

Crispin and his wife are residents of Glassboro, New Jersey.

References

External links
Rowan University Men's Basketball Coaching Staff 
NBA.com player profile
NBA stats @ basketball-reference.com
Player profile @ hoopshype.com
Crispin in action
Joe and Jon Crispin's web site
Basketball (EuroBasket)
TBLStat.net Profile

1979 births
Living people
AEK B.C. players
American expatriate basketball people in Greece
American expatriate basketball people in Italy
American expatriate basketball people in Poland
American expatriate basketball people in Spain
American expatriate basketball people in Turkey
American expatriate basketball people in Ukraine
American men's basketball players
ABA All-Star Game players
Bandırma B.İ.K. players
Basketball coaches from New Jersey
Basketball players from New Jersey
BC Azovmash players
Kansas City Knights players
KK Włocławek players
Los Angeles Lakers players
New Basket Brindisi players
Penn State Nittany Lions basketball players
People from Glassboro, New Jersey 
People from Pitman, New Jersey 
Phoenix Suns players
Point guards
Rockford Lightning players
Rowan Profs men's basketball coaches
Sportspeople from Gloucester County, New Jersey
Teramo Basket players
Undrafted National Basketball Association players